Gourlay is a surname from one of the Norman families living in Scotland, possibly from North or South Gorley (Hampshire) or an unidentified place in Normandy (France).

Origins of the Gourlay family 
Early medieval Scottish kings received aid from Norman knights, who were granted land in Scotland in recognition of their service to the crown. Gourlay is possibly a surname from these knights and seemed to arrive in Scotland in the 12th century. The earliest reference to the name is to a man known as Ingelram de Gourlay in Lothian. It is believed Ingelram de Gourlay accompanied William the Lion in 1174, and witnessed one of his charters circa 1200.

Variations 
Spelling variations of this family name include: Gourlay, Gourley, Gorley, Gurlay, Gurley, Gourlie, Gurle, Gurleghe, Golay.

Notable Gourlays 
Notable people with the surname include:

Andrew Gourlay, British conductor
David Gourlay, Scottish bowls player
Doug Gourlay (born 1929), politician in Manitoba, Canada
Harry Gourlay (1916–1987), Scottish Labour Party politician
Harry Gourlay (umpire) (1895–1970), New Zealand cricket umpire
Helen Gourlay (born 1946), tennis player from Australia
Ian Gourlay (1920–2013), British Royal Marines officer
James Gourlay, British conductor and internationally renowned tuba soloist
Janet Gourlay (1863–1912), Scottish Egyptologist, born in Glasgow
Jimmy Gourlay, Scottish footballer
John Gourlay (soccer) (1872–1949), Canadian amateur soccer player
John Gourlay (Scottish footballer) (1879 – unknown), a Scottish footballer
Molly Gourlay (1898–1990), British golfer who won several international championships
Robert Gourlay (merchant) 16th-century Scottish merchant and Customar of Edinburgh
Robert Fleming Gourlay (1778–1863), writer, moderate reformer and agriculturalist
Ron Gourlay, the Chief Executive of Chelsea Football Club from 2009
Scott Gourlay (born 1971), Scottish cricketer
William Gourlay Blair (1890–1957), politician and physician

See also
Gourlay Brothers & Co., a shipbuilding company and shipyard in Dundee, Scotland
Gourlay Peninsula, ice-free peninsula forming the southeast extremity of Signy Island in the South Orkney Islands
Gourlay Point, the southernmost of three finger-like points which form the southeast end of Signy Island in the South Orkney Islands

References

External links
 "Gurley" - Surname DNA Project

Scottish surnames